Kami is an Indo-Aryan Nepali speaking group that primarily worked as metalists. Later Nepal abolished its grading system.  The tribal designation of Khas is given in only a few contexts.
the Government of Nepal legally abolished the caste-system and criminalized any caste-based discrimination, including "untouchability" (the ostracism of a specific caste) - in the year 1963 A.D. With Nepal's step towards freedom and equality, Nepal, previously ruled by a Hindu monarchy was a Hindu nation which has now become a secular state, and on 28 May 2008, it was declared a republic, ending it as the Hindu Kingdom. Even though it is illegal to discriminate people based on their caste, these people are widely discriminated in Nepal. A large portion of people who follow Hinduism still discriminate Kami and other so-called lower castes. While a small minority of the population claims that the problems related to caste based discrimination are no longer present in Nepal, many are fully aware that these problems are rooted not only in tradition and culture, but also religion. Caste based discrimination and violence are a grim reality of Nepali society with numerous people losing their lives due to racially motivated mobs. Both the Government and many other INGO are working hand-in-hand in order to uproot the problem by targeting grassroot issues such as education, awareness and employment.

In the 21st century, the economic status of this group rapidly increased. They live in hilly or mountainous districts of Nepal and in the Indian areas of Assam, Sikkim and Darjeeling District.

Clans and surnames 

According to the 2001 Nepal census, 895,954 Kami inhabited the country, among which 96.69% were Hindus and 2.21% were Buddhists. Kami makes up 4.8% of Nepal's population (or 1,258,554 people) according to the survey of 2011.

Common surnames (Thar-थर) include Ghimire, Silwal, etc. Their surnames are similar to the Brahmins of Nepal. These surnames are used by Nepali community living in the different parts of India basically in North East States, Sikkim Darjeeling, Tarai and Dooars. In West Bengal these surnames are brought under Scheduled Caste. But in other states like Assam the people of Kami Community are not included in Scheduled Caste.

Economy 
The primary occupations include silversmith, ironsmith. Products include idols, weapons, and shields were also produced by these people in the past. In ancient times, few Kamis were literate and had poor economical status.

References

Bibliography

External links
 A Settlement and Smithy of Blacksmiths in Nepal

Ethnic groups in Nepal